Minuscule 438 (in the Gregory-Aland numbering), ε 211 (in the Soden numbering), is a Greek minuscule manuscript of the New Testament, on parchment. Palaeographically it has been assigned to the 12th century.

Description 

The codex contains a complete text of the four Gospels on 452 parchment leaves with only one lacunae (Matthew 1:6-15). The leaves of the manuscript were split in two volumes (211 + 241 leaves). The text is written in one column per page, in 18 lines per page.

There is also a division according to the Ammonian Sections (in Mark 234, 16:9), with references to the Eusebian Canons (not subscribed).

Text 

The Greek text of the codex is a representative of the Byzantine text-type. Hermann von Soden classified it to the textual family K1. Aland placed it in Category V.

According to the Claremont Profile Method it represents the textual family Kx in Luke 1 and Luke 20. In Luke 10 no profile was made.

History 

The manuscript was written by Gregory, a monk who died in 1189. It once belonged to Anthony Askew (1722–1774) (as codices 439 and 443). It was examined by Bloomfield. The manuscript was added to the list of New Testament manuscripts by Scholz (1794–1852).
C. R. Gregory saw it in 1883.

It is currently housed at the British Library (Add MSS 5111-5112) in London.

See also 

 List of New Testament minuscules
 Biblical manuscript
 Textual criticism

References

Further reading 

 

Greek New Testament minuscules
12th-century biblical manuscripts